Andrew Kratzmann and Jack Waite were the defending champions, but did not participate together this year.  Kratzmann partnered Libor Pimek, losing in the quarterfinals.  Waite did not participate this year.

Karim Alami and Julián Alonso won in the final 4–6, 6–3, 6–0, against Alberto Berasategui and Jordi Burillo.

Seeds

  Andrew Kratzmann /  Libor Pimek (quarterfinals)
  Albert Portas /  Francisco Roig (semifinals)
  Alberto Berasategui /  Jordi Burillo (final)
  Andrea Gaudenzi /  Nicolás Lapentti (first round)

Draw

Draw

External links
 Draw

Doubles